Charles E. Dickerson (born February 5, 1987), better known by his stage name Mono/Poly, is a Grammy Award winning electronic music producer from Bakersfield, California.

Career
Mono/Poly joined the record label Brainfeeder and released the Manifestations EP in 2011. He self-released the free EP, Killer B's, in 2012. The Golden Skies album was released on Brainfeeder in 2014.

Discography

Albums
 Paramatma (2010)
 Golden Skies (2014)
 MONOTOMIC (2019)
 Messages from the Cosmic Sea (2020)
 AS LONG AS THAT LOVE IS DIVINE (2020)

EPs
 The George Machine (2009)
 Manifestations (2011)
 Killer B's (2012)
 Cryptic (2016)
 Union (2017)

Singles
 "Bubble Sort" b/w "For Progressive Minds" (2008)
 "Oil Field" b/w "Medusa" (2009)
 "Stacking’ Ones" b/w “Teach You All A Lesson” (2019)

Productions
 Flash Bang Grenada - "In a Perfect World" from 10 Haters (2011)
 Busdriver - "Upsweep" from Perfect Hair (2014)
 Tha Dogg Pound - "Skip Skip" (2015)
 Ne-Yo - "Religious / Ratchet Wit Yo Friends" from Non-Fiction (2015)
 Thundercat - "Song for the Dead" and "Lone Wolf and Cub" from The Beyond / Where the Giants Roam (2015)
 Busdriver - "Hyperbolic 2" from Thumbs (2015)
 Kendrick Lamar - "Untitled 08 | 09.06.2014" from Untitled Unmastered (2016)
 Thundercat - "Friend Zone" from Drunk (2017)
Thundercat - "Black Qualls" from It Is What It Is (2020)
Thundercat - "Funny Thing" from it Is What It Is (2020)

Remixes
 Flying Lotus - "Melt!" from L.A. EP 2 X 3 (2008)
 Take - "Quartz for Amber" from Only Mountain: The Remixes (2011)
 Lorn - "Weigh Me Down" from Weigh Me Down (2012)
 S.Maharba - "Nice to Meet You" from S.Maharba: Remixed (2013)
 Nocando - "Zero Hour" from Jimmy the Burnout (2014)
 Sofie Letitre - "I Need" from Uncanny Valley (2015)
 Seven Davis Jr. - "Try Me (I'll Funk You)" (2015)
 Saul Williams - "Down For Some Ignorance [Mono/Poly Remix]" from "These Mthrfckrs: MartyrLoserKing - Remixes, B-Sides & Demos"
 Noisia - "Miniatures" from Outer Edges: Remixes (2017)

Compilation appearances
 "For Progressive Minds" on Circulations & Jay Scarlett Present: New Worlds (2008)
 "Red and Yellow Toys" on Wild Angels (2009)
 "The Nomad" (with Noisia) on Division VA EP 002 (2016)
 “Funkzilla” (with Seven Davis Jr) on “Brainfeeder X” (2018)

References

External links
 
 
 

American electronic musicians
American hip hop record producers
1987 births
Living people